A stockpile is a temporary storage method used in bulk material handling.

Stockpile may also refer to:

 Stockpile (military), a staging tactic involving the grouping of resources
 Soil stockpile, a method of storing topsoil during civil construction
 Panic buying, of consumer goods

See also
 Strategic National Stockpile